Cambrian School and College is a secondary and higher secondary school in Bangladesh, run by the BSB Global Network, and established in 2004. Ln. M.K. Bashar is the chairman and Ashraful Ahsan Khan is the principal. It has 16 campuses in Dhaka and Chittagong, Bangladesh.

References

External links
 Official website

Colleges in Bangladesh
Colleges in Dhaka District
Colleges in Chittagong
Private colleges in Bangladesh
Schools in Chittagong District